Pulchrana grandocula, also known as the big-eyed frog, is a species of "true frog", family Ranidae. It is endemic to the southern Philippines and occurs on the islands of Basilan, Bohol, Camiguin Sur, Dinagat, Samar, Siargao, Bucas Grande, and Mindanao. Some populations from Mindanao formerly assigned to this species are now recognized as a separate species, Pulchrana guttmani.

Pulchrana grandocula occurs in streams and rivers in montane and lowland forests at elevations below . It occurs in both undisturbed and disturbed habitats. Reproduction takes place in streams where also the tadpoles develop. Threats to this species are habitat loss and pollution, although it is a common species that has a stable population overall. It occurs in several protected areas.

References

grandocula
Amphibians of the Philippines
Endemic fauna of the Philippines
Fauna of Basilan
Fauna of Bohol
Fauna of Camiguin
Fauna of Dinagat Islands
Fauna of Samar
Fauna of Mindanao
Amphibians described in 1920
Taxa named by Edward Harrison Taylor